Dungeons & Dragons is a fantasy role-playing game.

Dungeons & Dragons may also refer to:
 Dungeons & Dragons (1974), the original edition of the game
 Dungeons & Dragons (TV series), an animated television series
 Dungeons & Dragons (film series), a series of films adapting the game
 Dungeons & Dragons (2000 film), a live-action fantasy film directed by Courtney Solomon
 Dungeons & Dragons: Honor Among Thieves, a live-action fantasy film directed by Jonathan Goldstein and John Francis Daley,
 Dungeons & Dragons (IDW Publishing), a comic book series based on the role-playing game
 Dungeons & Dragons (novels)
 "Dungeons and Dragons", a comedy sketch by the Dead Alewives on Take Down the Grand Master
 Dungeons & Dragons (album), an album by Midnight Syndicate
 "Dungeons & Dragons" (Terminator: The Sarah Connor Chronicles), an episode of Terminator: The Sarah Connor Chronicles

See also
 Advanced Dungeons & Dragons
 D&D (disambiguation)
 List of Dungeons & Dragons video games
 List of Wizards of the Coast products